Upton Cressett is a civil parish in Shropshire, England.  In the parish are six listed buildings that are recorded in the National Heritage List for England.  Of these, three are listed at Grade I, the highest of the three grades, and the others are at Grade II, the lowest grade.  The parish focuses on the settlement of Upton Cressett, which contains three buildings that are listed at Grade I, namely, a church, a country house, and its gatehouse.  The rest of the parish is entirely rural and the listed buildings here consist of two houses and a farmhouse.


Key

Buildings

References

Citations

Sources

Lists of buildings and structures in Shropshire